The 2002 Nordic Figure Skating Championships were held from February 8 through 10, 2002 in Vierumäki, Finland. The competition was open to elite figure skaters from Nordic countries. Skaters competed in two disciplines, men's singles and ladies' singles, across two levels: senior (Olympic-level) and junior.

Senior results

Men

Ladies

Junior results

Men

Ladies

External links
 2002 Nordics

Nordic Figure Skating Championships, 2002
Nordic Figure Skating Championships
International figure skating competitions hosted by Finland
Nordic Figure Skating Championships, 2002